There are several notable football rivalries in Spain, some of which attract worldwide attention.

Summary
The history of association football in the country dates from the 1890s, when the game was introduced to some port cities by British sailors and dock workers, and to other locations by locals who had been to Britain for education or work and had been exposed to the developing sport there. The earliest national competition was the 1902 Copa de la Coronación, followed by the introduction of the Copa del Rey a year later. In those formative decades, the dominant clubs were Athletic Bilbao, Real Madrid and FC Barcelona, a pattern which continued into the early editions of La Liga, the national league which was established in 1929.

The frequent important meetings in the cup and regular league fixtures, as well as each club becoming adopted as a symbol of their respective home regions, caused rivalries to develop between them, with the feud between Barcelona from Catalonia and Real Madrid from Castile, known as El Clásico, now being one of the most watched football matches around the world due to the sustained success of the two teams, who attract global fanbases, possess some of the top playing talent and have stadia which are among the largest in Europe.

In the early 21st century, a significant rivalry developed between the two most prominent forwards in each team, Portuguese Cristiano Ronaldo and Argentinian Lionel Messi, who consistently vied to break goalscoring records and win global individual awards in addition to helping their clubs to several major finals, with their mutual levels of performance seldom seen in the past – this added a new element to the matches between them and generated even more attention from media and supporters.

The third team in the original triad of success, Athletic Bilbao from the Basque Country, have fallen far behind in terms of their profile and trophies won due to being based in a smaller city and having a self-imposed restriction limiting themselves to a small pool of players with a connection to their home territory. However, their meetings with their old foes still maintain a level of interest due to the sporting history and political aspects of their relationships. Those are the only three teams to have played every league season, so have the highest total of matches contested.

Atlético Madrid, Valencia and Sevilla form a group of clubs who have caught up with Athletic Bilbao in terms of performance and cup wins and have similar levels of support, with attendances of 40,000 or better on average but are still far behind Barcelona and Real Madrid in both respects. Their proud histories feature complicated relationships with the 'big two' and with one another, as well as being involved in other local rivalries including the Seville derby and the Valencia derby.

After the biggest clubs, there are several significant derbies or rivalries which usually fall into one of three categories: a local rivalry within the same city (most of these involve one of the six clubs above, such as the Derbi barceloní and the Madrid Derby); a regional rivalry involving two or more teams in the same autonomous community, (often with each representing a province within that region, as in the Basque derby and the Galician derby); or an inter-regional rivalry between clubs from neighbouring autonomous communities, for example Osasuna of Navarre and Real Zaragoza of Aragon. Teams with significant support each have ultras groups with diverse connections and policial affiliations, which have often led to violence between them.

The term morbo (roughly translating to morbid fascination and antagonism) has sometimes been used to describe the attitudes relating to the complex network of identities and relationships between Spanish clubs.

List of rivalries

Local
Derbi barceloní (FC Barcelona v RCD Espanyol)
Madrid Derby (Real Madrid v Atlético Madrid)
Seville derby (Real Betis v Sevilla)
Valencia derby / 'Derby of the Turia' (Levante UD v Valencia CF)
Derbi jerezano (Xerez CD v Jerez Industrial CF)
Palma derby (Atlético Baleares v RCD Mallorca)
Derby de Murcia (Real Murcia v Ciudad de Murcia)
Nuevo Derbi de Murcia (Real Murcia v UCAM Murcia)
Sant Andreu derby (CE Europa v UE Sant Andreu)
Salamanca derbi / 'Derbi of the 50 metres': (Salamanca CF v Unionistas)
South Madrid derby (Getafe CF v CD Leganés)
(Santa Cruz de) La Palma derby (CD Mensajero v SD Tenisca)

Provincial
Derbi del Vallés Occidental (Sabadell v Terrassa)
Alicante Province derby (Hércules v Elche)
Derbi del interior de Alicante (CD Alcoyano v CD Eldense)
Derbi gaditano (Cádiz v Xerez)
Derbi jienense (Real Jaén v Linares)
Derbi leonés (Cultural Leonesa v Ponferradina) 
Derbi de La Plana (Castellón v Villarreal CF)
Badajoz derby (CD Badajoz v Mérida AD, alternatively Mérida AD v Extremadura UD)
Derbi del Tajo (CD Toledo v CF Talavera de la Reina)
Derbi del camp de Tarragona (Gimnàstic v Reus)
Derbi de la Bahía (Cádiz vs San Fernando)
Derbi campo gibraltareño (Linense v Algeciras)

Regional
Galician derby (Celta Vigo v Deportivo La Coruña)
Aragonese derby (Real Zaragoza v Huesca)
Asturian derby (Real Oviedo v Sporting Gijón)
Basque derby (Real Sociedad v Athletic Bilbao)
Basque rivalries (in addition to the above, matches between any of Athletic Bilbao, Real Sociedad, Alavés and Eibar; sometimes interpreted as also including Osasuna)
Canary Islands derby (Tenerife v Las Palmas)
Derbi de la Comunitat (Valencia v Villarreal, alternatively Valencia v Elche)
Derby of eastern Andalusia (Granada v Málaga)
Cantabrian derby (Racing de Santander v Gimnástica)
Catalan derby (in addition to the Derbi barceloní, any two of Barcelona, Espanyol, Girona or Gimnàstic Tarragona)
Extremaduran rivalries (in addition to the Badajoz and Cáceres provinces inner derbies, matches between CD Badajoz and CP Cacereño)
Derbi of the Region of Murcia (Cartagena v Real Murcia)
Galician rivalries (in addition to the Galician derby, matches between Racing Ferrol, Compostela and Pontevedra)
Derbi del Duero (Real Valladolid v Numancia)
Derbi del Norte de África (Ceuta v Melilla)

Inter-regional
Álava–Ebro rivalry (Alavés v Mirandés)
Derbi de los Ancares (Lugo v Ponferradina)
Derbi del Ebro (Real Zaragoza v Mirandés)
Derbi del Moncayo (Real Zaragoza v Numancia)
Derbi arlequinado (Ebro v Sabadell)
Aragón–Navarre rivalry (Real Zaragoza vs CA Osasuna)
Derbi del Cantábrico / 'Duel of the North' (Racing de Santander v Athletic Bilbao)
Derbi de la frontera (Elche v Real Murcia)
Derbi levantino (Hércules v Real Murcia)
Derbi del estrecho (Ceuta v Algeciras)
Atlético-Sevilla rivalry (Atlético Madrid v Sevilla FC)
Atlético-Athletic rivalry (Atlético Madrid v Athletic)

'Classicos'
El Clásico (Real Madrid v Barcelona)
List of El Clásico matches
El Viejo Clásico (Real Madrid v Athletic Bilbao)
Athletic–Barcelona clásico
El Otro Clásico (Barcelona v Atlético Madrid)

See also
 Association football and politics
 Football hooliganism#Spain
 Football in Spain
 Italy–Spain football rivalry
 Messi–Ronaldo rivalry
 National and regional identity in Spain
 Portugal–Spain football rivalry

References